Cha Sang-Hae (born on August 13, 1965) is a former South Korea football player. He was the K League Classic's top scorer in 1993.

Honors and awards

Player
POSCO Atoms
 K-League Winners (1) : 1992

Individual
 K-League Regular Season Top Scorer Award (1): 1993
 K-League Best XI (1) : 1993

External links

1965 births
Living people
Association football forwards
South Korean footballers
South Korea international footballers
K League 1 players
FC Seoul players
Busan IPark players
Pohang Steelers players
Jeju United FC players